This is the complete list of official Individual Speedway World Championship  and Speedway Grand Prix medalists from 1936 to 2020. (n.b: Winners of Speedway World Championships between 1931 and '35, staged prior to FIM accreditation in 1936 are given elsewhere.)

Medalists

Grand Prix Series (since 1995) 

In 2021 Artem Laguta and Emil Sayfutdinov were neutral competitors using the designation MFR (Motorcycle Federation of Russia), as the World Anti-Doping Agency implemented a ban on Russia competing at World Championships.

Medal table

Winners by country 
Up to and including 2022

Medals by winners

See also
 Motorcycle speedway

References

!
!
Speedway Individual World Championship